Ugo Pagliai (born 13 November 1937) is an Italian actor and voice actor.

Life and career
In 1958, Pagliai enrolled at the Accademia Nazionale d'Arte Drammatica, starting his career on stage in the early 1960s. He became first known in 1969, thanks to the Giuseppe Fina's critically acclaimed stage play, Ross.

In 1971, he had a major success as the lead actor of the Daniele D'Anza's miniseries, Il segno del comando, and then appeared in a number of other successful RAI TV-series, often directed by D'Anza. He is mainly active onstage, often with his wife, Paola Gassman, the daughter of actors Vittorio Gassman and Nora Ricci. In 1988, Pagliai received a Flaiano Prize for his career.

Selected filmography

I complessi (1963) - Failed Applicant (segment "Guglielmo il Dentone") (uncredited)
Da Berlino l'apocalisse (1967)
Jerk à Istambul (1967) - Ralph
 Heads or Tails (1969) - Burton
O Cangaceiro (1970) - Vincenzo Helfen
Guardami nuda (1972) - Carlo
The Red Queen Kills Seven Times (1972) - Martin Hoffmann
La ragazza dalla pelle di luna (1974) - Alberto
Till Marriage Do Us Part (1974) - Ruggero di Maqueda
Nuits Rouges (1974) - Paul de Borrego
Di padre in figlio (1982) - Himself
Fatal Frames - Fotogrammi mortali (1996) - Commissioner Valenti
Bagnomaria (1999) - The Mayor
I giorni dell'amore e dell'odio (2001) - Ten. Col. Barge
Father of Mercy (2004) - Cardinal Schuster
Family Game (2007) - Prof. Moroni
Loro (2018) - Mike Bongiorno

References

External links
 

1937 births
People from Pistoia
Italian male film actors
20th-century Italian male actors
Italian male stage actors
Italian male television actors
Italian male voice actors
Living people
Accademia Nazionale di Arte Drammatica Silvio D'Amico alumni